Helen Kelly (born 7 August 1971) is a track and road cyclist from Australia. She represented her nation at the 2005 and 2006 UCI Road World Championships.

References

External links
 profile at Procyclingstats.com

1971 births
Australian female cyclists
Living people
Place of birth missing (living people)
20th-century Australian women
21st-century Australian women